The Niue National Awards is a system of orders, decorations and medals to recognise the achievements of, or service by, Niueans. It was established in 2020. Previously Niue had fallen under the New Zealand royal honours system. The awards are decided by the National Awards Committee and announced each year on Constitution Day, 19 October.

There are three levels of awards:
 The Niue Distinguished Service Cross (NDSC) for distinguished service, for those who have " contributed many years of outstanding service to the people and nation of Niue";
 The Niue Public Service Medal (NPSM) for those who have contributed significantly as members of the Niue Public Service; and
 The Niue Community Service Star (NCSS) for community service.

The first awards were made in October 2020. Successive awards have been made in 2021 and 2022.

References

External links

 The Niue Honours Awards

Niue and the Commonwealth of Nations